USS Delaware was a 24-gun sailing frigate of the United States Navy that had a short career in the American Revolutionary War as the British Royal Navy captured her in 1777. The Royal Navy took her in as an "armed ship", and later classed her a sixth rate. The Royal Navy sold her in 1783. British owners named her United States and then French interests purchased her and named her Dauphin. She spent some years as a whaler and then in March 1795 she was converted at Charleston, South Carolina, to French privateer. Her subsequent fate is unclear.

US Navy
She was built under the 13 December 1775 order of the Continental Congress in the yard of Warwick Coates of Philadelphia, Pennsylvania, under the direction of the Marine Committee. Upon her launching in July 1776, Captain C. Alexander took command.

Delaware served in the Delaware River, joining with Commodore John Hazelwood's Pennsylvania state ships in operations that delayed the British Fleet in approaching Philadelphia and supplying the British Army. When the British took possession of Philadelphia 26 September 1777, Delaware, now under the command of John Barry, in company with several smaller ships, advanced upon the enemy fortifications which were being erected and opened a destructive fire while anchored some 500 yards from shore.

On 27 September she went aground on the ebb tide and came under the concentrated fire of the British artillery. After a brave defense against overwhelming odds, Captain Alexander was compelled to strike his colors. Delaware was taken into the Royal Navy.

Royal Navy
The Royal Navy took her in as an "armed ship", and later classed her a sixth rate. As an armed ship her captain was Commander James Watt. In April 1778 Commander Christopher Mason commissioned her.

On 1 December 1779 Delaware escorted a convoy of supply ships to Bermuda, and also brought some 100 officers and men of the Royal Garrison Battalion of Veterans to defend Bermuda. She and the troops arrived in time to forestall an American attack. When four American naval vessels arrived later that day they saw Delaware in place and British troops patrolling, and so left quickly.

On 6 June 1779  captured the American privateer Oliver Cromwell. Delaware and the privateer Union were in company and so shared in the prize money.

On 21 and 23 April 1780 Iris, Delaware, and  captured the American privateers Amazon, General Wayne, and Neptune. The capture had taken place a few leagues from Sandy Hook and Iris and Delaware brought them into New York on 1 May.

United States
The Royal Navy sold Delaware on 14 April 1783 for £300 to Mary Hayley, who renamed her United States. She sailed from Falmouth to Boston in April 1784. Hayley had the boat fitted out as a whaler and seal hunting vessel, shipping to the Falkland Islands in late 1784. The ship returned in 1785 with a cargo of whale oil, which was seized by customs agents. After a trial, the Crown lost its case against Hayley for duty, as she was a British citizen, and was ordered to pay her £4,000 for her losses.

United States first appeared in Lloyd's Register (LR) in 1786 with J.Scott, master, Mrs Hayley, owner, and trade London–Boston. She had undergone a thorough repair in 1784. She was no longer listed in LR in 1787.

In the fall of 1786, Francis Rotch reported that Hayley had sold the United States to the firm Brothers DeBauque and that he had advised them to send the ship to the Falklands rather than Greenland.

Dauphin
United States may have operated under both that name, and under Dauphin for some years.

French records that show Dauphin in 1785 with Paul Coffin, master. She was described as a frigate of 695 tons. Her known ports of call included Lorient (1792), New Bedford (November 1792), then Brazil, Delagoa Bay, Saint-Laurent Bay, Île de France, and Nantucket in November 1793. She became American again in November 1793, and was in Dunkirk in 1794.

As United States she made a second voyage to the Falklands in 1786. A whaler by the name of United States arrived at Dunkirk in July 1787 from the Falklands.

Francis Rotch commissioned her in August 1787 under the name Dauphin.

French records indicate that under Captain Uriah Swain, Dauphin, Francis Rotch, agent, sailed to the coast of Brazil on 18 August 1787, and returned on 4 July 1788 with 1452 barrels of whale oil and 16,000 lbs of whalebone. She returned to Dover in 1788, selling her 25,000 gallons of whale oil duty free. The 13,000 seal skins she had collected were sold in China for ten times their New York value, confirming the lucrative nature of the China Trade. After this voyage, the vessel was sold in 1788 to the French South Sea whaling partnership.

In 1791 Dauphin was under the command of Jonathan Parker.

On 22 November 1792 Dauphin sailed for Brazil and Delagoa Bay under the command of Captain Stephen Gardner. At some point he left and Captain Lallermant replaced him. She returned in November 1793 with 1900 barrels of whale oil.

In May 1794 Dauphin arrived at Charleston, South Carolina. She was sold at auction on 23 June to Jean Bouteille who wished to convert her to a privateer. Despite efforts by Benjamin Moodie, the British Vice-consul in Charleston to block her conversion, in March 1795 she was ready and sailed for Port-de-Paix. Her ultimate fate is unknown.

See also

List of sailing frigates of the United States Navy
List of ships captured in the 18th century
Bibliography of early American naval history

Notes, citations, and references
Notes

Citations

References
 
 
 

Storms, Robbi, and Don Malcarne (2001) Around Essex: Elephants and River Gods. (Arcadia Publishing). 
 
 

Ships of the Continental Navy
Sailing frigates of the United States Navy
Ships built in Philadelphia
1776 ships
Captured ships
Sixth rates of the Royal Navy
Maritime incidents in 1777
Whaling ships
Age of Sail merchant ships
Privateer ships of France